Summer is the sixth album of pianist George Winston and his fifth solo piano album, released in 1991. It was reissued on Dancing Cat Records in 2008.

The album was certified Gold by the RIAA on January 15, 1992.

Track listing

Charts

References

1991 albums
George Winston albums
Dancing Cat Records albums
Windham Hill Records albums